The Hungarian Football League (HFL) is the top tier national American football competition in Hungary, organized by the Hungarian Federation of American Football (MAFSZ). The competition was formerly called Hungarian American Football League (MAFL), the top tier as MAFL Division I and the second tier as MAFL Division II; since 2012 the top tier is HFL, the 2nd tier is MAFSZ Division I and the 3rd tier is MAFSZ Division II.

History
The Hungarian American Football League (MAFL) began in 2005 under the guidance of the Hungarian Federation of American Football (MAFSZ) with 4 teams (Budapest Wolves, Győr Sharks, Debrecen Gladiators, Nagykanizsa Demos. The game rules are the standard gridiron football (NCAA) rules. The first winner of the first Hungarian Bowl was the Wolves.

In the next 2 years, the Wolves participated only in the Austrian Football League 3rd tier. These 2 years were won by the Sharks. In 2006, eight teams participated. In 2007, the championship had been split into two divisions (6 teams at Division I and 9 at Division II).

In 2008, the Wolves returned, and they won 3 more championships undefeated. In 2009, 26 teams participated so Division III had been introduced (this year 5, 12, and 9 teams have been played in the three tiers). In 2010, they returned into the 2 tier format.

In 2011, MAFSZ restructured the championship format with the introduction of Hungarian Football League (HFL), which was intended to be an international competition with the top 4 Hungarian teams and 4 from abroad. Division I and Division II became the 2nd and 3rd tier competitions, which were played in the spring season. The HFL was scheduled as a fall season but only 3 teams were willing to participate, so in 2011, the Hungarian Bowl was canceled.

In 2012, the HFL finally started, and this year the Budapest Wolves suffered their first-ever defeat against a Hungarian team (against Budapest Hurricanes), but in the final, the Wolves defeated the Hurricanes. However, in 2013, the Hurricanes, in 2014 the Újbuda Rebels, and in 2015 the Bratislava Monarchs defeated the Wolves in the Hungarian Bowl. The 2015 season was the only one when a foreign team participated, and with the Monarchs' win, the official Hungarian champion was the HFL runners-up Wolves.

In 2016, the Miskolc Steelers became the first non-capital city team in HFL history to participate in the finals, and they won the trophy as well, becoming the 6th team to win HFL in the 6 years' HFL history. In 2017, the Cowbells won the trophy, being technically the 7th team to win the HFL, but as they are the successor of Újbuda Rebels, they are the first team to win 2 HFL trophies.

Hungarian American Football League System

Champions

Championship Games

Hungarian Bowl
The Hungarian Bowl is the Championship Game of the Hungarian American Football League. Between 2005 and 2010 it was the final of the MAFL Division I. In 2011, the new top-tier championship HFL was postponed, no Hungarian Bowl took place, and the Fall Bowl was an unofficial championship. Since 2012, the Hungarian Bowl has been the final of the Hungarian Football League.

Hungarian Bowl results

Hungarian Bowl Statistics

Pannon Bowl
The Pannon Bowl is the MAFSZ's second-tier championship game that was first played in 2007.

Pannon Bowl results

Duna Bowl
The Duna Bowl is the third-tier championship game of the MAFSZ.

Duna Bowl results

Blue Bowl
In 2006, the MAFSZ created the Blue Bowl, the national cup game.

Blue Bowl results

Teams

References

External links
 The MAFSZ Official Website
 Hungarian American Football League historical scores

Amer
Spa
Sports leagues established in 2005
2005 establishments in Hungary